The gymnastics competitions at the 2021 Southeast Asian Games took place at Quần Ngựa Sports Palace in Hanoi, Vietnam from 13 to 22 May 2022.

Schedule

The following is the schedule for the gymnastics competitions.  All times in UTC+07:00.

Artistic
Friday, 13 May
 10:00-18:30 – Men's team and all-around finals

Saturday, 14 May
 10:00-18:30 – Women's team and all-around finals

Sunday, 15 May
 14:00-17:00 – Men's floor exercise, pommel horse, and still rings and women's vault and uneven bars apparatus finals

Monday, 16 May
 14:00-17:00 – Men's vault, parallel bars, and high bar and women's balance beam and floor exercise apparatus finals

Medal summary

Medalists

Aerobic

Artistic

Men

Women

Rhythmic

References

 
Southeast Asia